Tauno Jaskari (born 1 June 1934) is a Finnish wrestler. He competed at the 1952, 1956, 1960 and the 1964 Summer Olympics.

References

External links
 

1934 births
Living people
Finnish male sport wrestlers
Olympic wrestlers of Finland
Wrestlers at the 1952 Summer Olympics
Wrestlers at the 1956 Summer Olympics
Wrestlers at the 1960 Summer Olympics
Wrestlers at the 1964 Summer Olympics
Sportspeople from South Ostrobothnia
World Wrestling Championships medalists